The Very Thought of You is the third album by Nicole Henry. It was released through Banister Records on September 19, 2008. The album charted on the Billboard Traditional Jazz Albums chart at No. 7 and No. 18 on the Jazz Albums chart.

Track listing

Track information and credits adapted from the album's liner notes.

Musicians

Nicole Henry – vocals
Danny Burger – drums (Tracks 1-2, 9-10)
David Chiverton – drums (Track 7)
Orlando Hernandez – drums (Tracks 3-6, 8, 12)
Sammy Figueroa – percussion (Track 4)
Aaron Fishbein – guitar (Track 7)
Manny López – guitar (Track 6)
Mariana Martin – guitar (Track 4)
James Bryan McCollum – guitar (Track 7)
Brian Michael Murphy – keyboards (Tracks 1-10), piano (Tracks 1-2, 9-10)
Mike Orta – arranger, keyboards (Tracks 4, 6-7, 12), piano (Tracks 4, 6-7, 11-12)
Jaui Schneider – piano (Tracks 3, 5, 8)
Jamie Ousley – upright bass (Tracks 3-8, 12)
Paul Shewchuk – upright bass (Tracks 1-2, 9-10)

Production

Nicole Henry – Producer, Executive Producer
Hal Batt – Producer, Mixing, Recording Engineer (Track 7), Vocal Recording Engineer (Tracks 7-12)
Carlos Alvarez – Recording Engineer (Tracks 1, 3-6, 8, 11-12), Vocal Recording Engineer (Tracks 1-6)
Ron Taylor – Recording Engineer (Tracks 2, 9-10)
Don Mizell – Executive Producer
Bruce Weeden – Mastering
Rachel Faro – Production Assistant
Patrick Magee – Assistant Engineer (Tracks 1-6, 8-12)
Daniel Lugo – Photography

Charts

References

2008 albums